Antoine-Adrien Lamourette (31 May 1742 – 11 January 1794) was a French priest and politician, who during the French Revolution accepted the Civil Constitution of the Clergy and became the first  constitutional bishop, in schism from the Roman Catholic Church.

Biography 
Lamourette was born in Frevent, Nord-Pas-de-Calais, in the Kingdom of France on 31 May 1742 to a family of humble artisans. In 1759 he joined the Vincentians and was ordained in 1769. In 1772 he was appointed Professor of Philosophy at the Vincentian seminary in Metz, Burgundy. From 1783, he lived in Paris, and published his own works, believing that "religious vows should not lead to civil death". He promoted religious tolerance and wanted to reduce the privileges of the high priesthood, a problem that would lead to the French Revolution in 1789. When the storming of the Bastille occurred, he wrote a defense for the taking of the Bastille prison, and in November 1790, he allied with French politician Mirabeau. Lamourette preached for "Christian democracy" and is famous for inventing the "Lamourette kiss" (fr), a fraternal embrace in which he sought to do away with all disputes between the parties in the Legislative Assembly while representing Rhone-et-Loire.

However, he protested against the September Massacres of 1792 and was linked to the 1793 Girondist revolt in Lyon. He was arrested on 29 September 1793 and was guillotined on 11 January 1794 in Paris.

1742 births
1794 deaths
Vincentians
French politicians
Constitutional bishops
French people executed by guillotine during the French Revolution